Boris Stepanov (22 August 1930 – 28 December 2007) was a Russian boxer. He competed in the men's bantamweight event at the 1956 Summer Olympics. At the 1956 Summer Olympics in Melbourne, he received a bye in the Round of 64 and then lost by knockout to Frederick Gilroy of Ireland in the Round of 32.

References

External links
 

1930 births
2007 deaths
Russian male boxers
Olympic boxers of the Soviet Union
Boxers at the 1956 Summer Olympics
Martial artists from Moscow
Bantamweight boxers